"Blackout" is a song by Australian pop singer Bonnie Anderson and was released in June 2014. The song is about acting on your strongest desires and came out of a collaboration between Anderson and RedOne during a recent writing trip to Los Angeles. It peaked at number 24 on the ARIA Charts and was certified gold.

Anderson said "'Blackout' came from a conversation we were having about boys... hot boys! It is about a desperate desire and wanting something so badly and so passionately, you just have to have it now! The 'blackout' is that intense secret moment between you and that person, and nothing else matters."

The song has been sampled a number of times, most notably in the Karol G hit "Mi Cama", which reached the top 5 on the Spanish Promusicae charts.

Music video
The music video for "Blackout" was directed by Christopher Frey and released on 6 June 2014.

Track listing
Digital single
 "Blackout" - 3:05

CD single
 "Blackout" - 3:03
 "Blackout" (Johnny Labs & Statik Link Trap Club Mix)  - 3:05
 "Blackout" (ATP Remix)  - 3:31
 "Blackout" (Bexta Club Mix)  - 3:28
 "Blackout" (acoustic)  - 3:25

Digital single
 "Blackout"  Marcus Santoro remix  - 5:39

Charts

Weekly charts

Year-end charts

Certifications

Release history

References

2014 singles
2014 songs
Bonnie Anderson (singer) songs
Songs written by Eric Sanicola
Sony Music Australia singles